Bembridge School And Cliffs SSSI is a 12.58 hectare geological Site of Special Scientific Interest near Bembridge on the Isle of Wight, notified in 1999.

It is listed in the Geological Conservation Review.
This site consists of the coastral strip in the northern part of Whitecliff Bay. Steyne Wood Clays containing fossils from the Quaternary period are found at the site.

References

Sites of Special Scientific Interest on the Isle of Wight
Bembridge